Raymond Leboursier (22 May 1917 – 26 July 1987) was a French film editor, film director, actor, and screenwriter.

Filmography

Actor 
 1930: Le Réquisitoire (first title of the film: Homicide) by Dimitri Buchowetzki
 1931: The Devil's Holiday by Alberto Cavalcanti: Monk McConnell
 1931: À mi-chemin du ciel by Alberto Cavalcanti
 1932:  by Fred Ellis and Max Neufeld
 1934:  by Serge de Poligny
 1934: Château de rêve by Géza von Bolváry and Henri-Georges Clouzot

Director 
 1942: 
 1945: Naïs, directed with Marcel Pagnol
 1949: 
 1949: 
 1951: La vie est un jeu
 1952: 
 1959: Henri Gagnon organiste
 1960: Le Prix de la science (short film)
 1961: Dubois et fils (documentary), codirected with Bernard Devlin 
 1969:

Assistant director 
 1948: Les Parents terribles by Jean Cocteau

Film editor 
 1936:  de Jean Dréville
 1937:  de Jean Dréville
 1937:  de Willy Rozier
 1938: His Uncle from Normandy de Jean Dréville
 1938: The Chess Player de Jean Dréville
 1938: Rasputin de Marcel L'Herbier
 1939: Entente cordiale by Marcel L'Herbier 
 1940:  by Jacques Daniel-Norman
 1940: President Haudecoeur by Jean Dréville
 1941:  by Fernand Rivers 
 1941:  by Maurice Cammage
 1942:  by Georges Lacombe
 1942:  by Georges Lacombe
 1943: Domino by Roger Richebé
 1948: The Eagle with Two Heads by Jean Cocteau
 1949: The Cupid Club by Marc-Gilbert Sauvajon
 1953: Their Last Night by Georges Lacombe
 1953:  by Raymond Bernard
 1955: Les Fruits de l'été by Raymond Bernard
 1955: The Light Across the Street by Georges Lacombe
 1956: Babes a GoGo by Paul Mesnier
 1957:  by Jean Dréville
 1958:  by Claude Jutra
 1959: Les Brûlés by Bernard Devlin
 1960: Walk down Any Street (short film) by Bernard Devlin
 1967: Comment les séduire de Jean-Claude Roy
 1967: The Viscount by Maurice Cloche

External links 
 

French film directors
French male actors
French male screenwriters
20th-century French screenwriters
French film editors
1917 births
1987 deaths
French male non-fiction writers
20th-century French male writers